Hammerer is a surname. Notable people with the surname include:

Hubert Hammerer (1925–2017), Austrian sport shooter
Markus Hammerer (born 1989), Austrian footballer
Resi Hammerer (1925–2010), Austrian alpine skier
Véronique Hammerer (born 1968), French politician

See also
Hammer (disambiguation)

Surnames
Surnames of German origin
German-language surnames